Anas Khalid Al Saleh (born on 11 January 1972), also known as AKS, is a Kuwaiti politician who has been serving as deputy prime minister and minister of interior and cabinet affairs, He also served as minister of finance from January 2014 to December 2017 and as minister of commerce and industry from February 2012 to January 2014.

Early life and education
Al Saleh was born in 1972. He received a bachelor's degree in business administration from Portland State University in 1997. In 2017, Al Saleh was also awarded an honorary degree by his alma mater, Portland State University.

Career
Anas Al Saleh was the board chairman and managing director of Kuwait Invest Holding Company (KSCC) in 2006 and the board member of Kuwait Chamber of Commerce and Industry (KCCI) from 2006 to 2010. He was appointed minister of commerce and industry to the cabinet led by Prime Minister Jaber Al Mubarak Al Hamad Al Sabah in February 2012 He was also made chairman of foreign investment capital committee. He retained his post in the August 2013 reshuffle. In January 2014, his term as minister of commerce and industry ended and Abdulmohsen Al Madaj replaced him in the post.

Al Saleh was appointed minister of finance in the same reshuffle, replacing Salem Abdulaziz Al Sabah in the post. In January 2015 he was appointed deputy prime minister. In November 2015 he also became Kuwait's acting oil minister.

References

21st-century Kuwaiti people
1972 births
Finance ministers of Kuwait
Living people
Oil ministers of Kuwait
Portland State University alumni